Isaiah (Ike) Blessitt (born September 30, 1949), is a former Major League Baseball (MLB) outfielder who played in 1972 with the Detroit Tigers. He batted and threw right-handed. Blessitt had no hits in five at bats in four games, in his one-year career.

He was drafted by the Tigers in the 15th round of the 1967 amateur draft.

External links

1949 births
Living people
African-American baseball players
Detroit Tigers players
Major League Baseball outfielders
Baseball players from Michigan
Lakeland Tigers players
Rocky Mount Leafs players
Montgomery Rebels players
Toledo Mud Hens players
Tucson Toros players
Birmingham A's players
Holyoke Millers players
Petroleros de Zulia players
Orlando Juice players